Eva Angelina is an American pornographic actress. She has won several industry awards, including the 2007 NightMoves Award for Best Actress, the 2008 AVN Award for Best Actress, the 2008 XRCO Award for Best Actress, and the 2008 XBIZ Award for Female Performer of the Year. She was inducted into the AVN Hall of Fame in 2018.

Early life
Angelina was born in Huntington Beach, California.

Career
Angelina entered the porn industry by answering a newspaper advertisement; her first scene was for the Shane's World series with Mr. Pete in 2003, at the age of 18.
She is known for wearing glasses during her performances.
In 2010 she was named by Maxim as one of the 12 top female stars in porn.
In 2014 she told Vice that she had earned a real estate license and was seeking to transition away from porn.

Personal life
She was married to British pornographic actor Danny Mountain from 2007 to 2009. She has two children.

Awards
 2007 NightMoves Award – Best Actress (Fan's Choice)
 2008 AVN Award – Best Actress - Video – Upload
 2008 AVN Award – Best Solo Sex Scene - Video – Upload
 2008 XBIZ Award – Female Performer of the Year
 2008 XRCO Award – Best Actress, Single Performance – Upload
 2010 AVN Award – Best All-Girl Group Sex Scene – Deviance
 2010 XBIZ Award – Pornstar Website of the Year
 2010 XRCO Award – Best Cumback
 2011 AVN Award – Best Tease Performance – Car Wash Girls
 2018 AVN Hall of Fame

References

External links

 
 
 

1980s births
American female adult models
American female erotic dancers
American erotic dancers
American pornographic film actresses
Living people
Pornographic film actors from California
American real estate businesspeople
21st-century American women